N. albipes may refer to:
 Neobatrachus albipes, the white-footed frog or white-footed trilling frog, a frog species endemic to Australia
 Neuroterus albipes, a gall wasp species that forms chemically induced leaf galls on oak trees

See also
 Albipes